Recovery was built at Liverpool in 1793. She was a West Indiaman that sailed under a letter of marque. The French privateer  captured her in 1799. She returned to British ownership by 1800 and continued to trade until she foundered in June 1818 on her way from Hull to Miramichi Bay.

Career
Recovery appeared in Lloyd's Register in 1793 with "T. Kenop", master, Rd Watt, owner, and trade Liverpool–Jamaica.

Captain Archibald Kennan acquired a letter of marque on 17 October 1793.

Recovery underwent repairs in 1794 for damages.

Captain Michael Whaley acquired a letter of marque on 28 September 1797. 

Lloyd's Register for 1799 showed Recovery with T. Phillips, master, Walker & Co., owners, and trade Liverpool–Jamaica.

Recovery, Phillips, master, was sailing from Jamaica to Liverpool when Courageaux captured her in April 1799. Courageaux also captured three other vessels that month: , Mary, and Fanny. Courageaux sent her prizes into Passages; the captains were returned to Poole. The French papers reported that Mary and three other vessels from a convoy from the West Indies, prizes to Courageux, had arrived in France on the 17th of April.

In a process that is currently obscure, Recovery returned to British ownership. LR for 1800 showed Recovery, of 332 tons (bm), built at Liverpool in 1793, with Abercrombie, master, Young & Co., owners, and trade London–Tobago. LL for 24 June 1800 reported that Recovery, Abercromby, master, had run onshore at Tobago while sailing for London. A small part of her cargo had been saved. However, Recovery was repaired and returned to service. 

On 30 December 1810 Recovery, Hawkins, master, put into Portsmouth leaky; she was to be docked for examination and repairs. She was on her way to Jamaica. 

Recovery was condemned in 1815. However, she underwent a thorough repair and repair of damages. The supplemental pages in LR for 1815 show her with W.Draper, master, Moxon, owner, and trade London-Baltic.

On 6 June 1817 Recovery, Hornby, master, arrived at Petersburg from Hull. By 25 August she arrived back at Hull from Petersburg. By 29 September she was at Petersburg again.

Loss
On 10 June 1818 Recovery, of Hull, Biggins, master, Moxon, owner, foundered. She struck a big piece of ice in the Gulf of Saint Lawrence off the Magdalen Islands. Middleton rescued her 16 crew. Recovery was on a voyage to Hull to Miramichi Bay.

Citations

1793 ships
Ships built in England
Age of Sail merchant ships of England
Captured ships
Maritime incidents in 1800
Shipwrecks in the Caribbean Sea
Maritime incidents in 1818
Shipwrecks in the Gulf of Saint Lawrence